Agüimes is a Spanish town and municipality in the eastern part of the island of Gran Canaria in the Las Palmas province in the Canary Islands.

Presentation 

Agüimes is situated 5 km from the coast, and 26 km south of the island capital Las Palmas. The GC-1 motorway passes east of the town.

The population is 30,214 (2013), and the area is 79.28 km². The elevation is 275 m.

Evolution of the population

Climate

Economy 

The major growth of the last few years has been the creation of a huge industrial estate on flat land once covered by tomato plantations. This has brought new jobs and industries into the area and has spurred the development of a new purpose-built port which is due to open in 2007.

Tourism 

The district was not at one time a major tourist destination, but after the careful restoration of the old town, this has become the best example of a traditional Canarian hill town. The streets of the old town exude a gentle, relaxed, timeless atmosphere, and the carefully positioned street statues and sculptures add a series of surprises to a visit to the old town. The local plan for 'rural tourism' has led to the development of other small visitor centres on the district, the biggest of which is in the Guayadeque ravine. This area has many cave houses dating back hundreds of years, and a complete village excavated into the hillside, still occupied today, with its own cave chapel, cave bar and cave restaurants.

The Temisas Astronomical Observatory, on Montaña de Arriba near Temisas, is a popular visitor attraction, offering regular events related to astronomy.

Sports 
Sporting activities are also very important in the area, with its windsurfing and scuba diving recognized as "world-class". The windsurfing world cup at Pozo Izquierdo is an important event on the PWA World Tour. The whole of the coast in this area can provide challenging windsurfing conditions at any time of the year.

The main area for scuba diving in Gran Canaria is in the area known as the 'El Cabrón' marine reserve, next to the town of Arinaga. The diving in this area includes caves, arches, walls and volcanic reefs where an extremely wide range of sub-tropical marine species can be found, from tiny seahorses up to rays and angel sharks.

Heritage sites
In the centre of the town, the large, domed  in Plaza Nuestra Señora del Rosario is a noted example of Canarian Neoclassical architecture. Construction of the church started in 1796 and it was only completed in 1940.

 south-west of Agüimes on the south coast of the island there stands a full-scale replica of the  San Sebastián Church. It was erected in 2014 by the hotelier , who originated from Agüimes, as part of a luxury hotel complex, the Lopesan Costa Meloneras Hotel in Maspalomas. The hotel consists of buildings designed in a Canarian Spanish Colonial Revival style to recreate the historic environment of Agüimes, including a copy of the church.

The Agüimes municipality's territory is rich in historical sites, among which the El Maipés necropolis in Agaete is a well-known site. The caves and granaries of the Audience site in Temisas and the caves and hillocks in Avila have been declared Sites of cultural interest in 2016.

Gallery

See also
List of municipalities in Las Palmas

References

External links

Agüimes.es Website of the local council (Ayuntamiento de Agüimes)
Patinegro Local environmental action group Patinegro

Municipalities in Gran Canaria